Kathmandu Kings XI are a professional franchise cricket team based in the capital city of Nepal, Kathmandu. One of the major franchises in  Everest Premier League since 2017,Which is owned by Ramesh Corp.

Management
The team was owned by Rohit Gupta, as of 2017. As of 2017, Raj Jung Thapa was the chief operating officer (COO) and was later named chief executive officer (CEO) of the City-based Franchises. The same year, the team signed Binod Das as head coach.

Players
In 2017, Sompal Kami was designated the marquee player of the team, while Sri Lankan international cricketer Mohamed Ferveez Maharoof was signed on as skipper for an undisclosed sum. It also signed two other foreign players, Akshay Fernandez of Sri Lanka and Sagar Kumar of India. Other players in the team included Sagar Pun and Amit Shrestha.

In the 2018 season, the team was captained by Sompal Kami. Its players included Siddhant Lohani, Raju Rijal, Bikram Bhusal, Rohan Mustafa, Kevin O'Brien, Jitendra Mukhiya and Pradeep Sahu. Sikandar Raza was also expected to sign on but had to withdraw at the last minute.

On 26 July 2021, they announced the signing of Shahid Afridi.

Everest Premier League

2017 season
The team secured their first win of the season in their third game, played against Chitwan Tigers, having lost their first two matches to Lalitpur Patriots and Bhairahawa Gladiators.

2018 season
The team reached the playoffs with a match to spare in the league stage. It was defeated by Lalitpur Patriots in the first qualifier by one wicket.

References

Cricket in Nepal
Everest Premier League
2017 establishments in Nepal
Sport in Kathmandu